Robert Cecil Lindsay Montgomerie (15 February 1880 – 28 April 1939) was a British fencer. He won two silver medals in the team épée competitions at the 1908 and 1912 Summer Olympics. Montgomerie was a nine times British fencing champion, winning four foil titles and five épée titles at the British Fencing Championships, from 1905 to 1914.

References

1880 births
1939 deaths
British male fencers
Olympic fencers of Great Britain
Fencers at the 1908 Summer Olympics
Fencers at the 1912 Summer Olympics
Fencers at the 1920 Summer Olympics
Fencers at the 1924 Summer Olympics
Fencers at the 1928 Summer Olympics
Olympic silver medallists for Great Britain
Olympic medalists in fencing
People from South Kensington
Sportspeople from London
Medalists at the 1908 Summer Olympics
Medalists at the 1912 Summer Olympics